The National Irish American Museum Of Washington, D.C. is a proposed museum to honor Ireland’s legacy in America.

History
The museum was proposed in 2008, but active fundraising was deferred due to the Financial crisis of 2007–08, and in 2015 the Washington Post deemed the museum unlikely to ever open.

Objective

The museum's objective is "to become a major cultural institution that will bring Irish-American history to life for visitors of all ages, from all ethnic, racial, and cultural backgrounds."

National Irish American Virtual Museum

A "Virtual Museum" has been created with a short video and biographical sections on numerous
Irish Americans from 1776 to the modern era in the fields of innovation, acting, the arts, leadership, legal, media, medical, military, music, science, technology, and sports.

See also
 Cobh Heritage Centre
 Ireland’s Great Hunger Museum

References

External links
Official website
 http://www.irishamericanmuseumdc.org/in-the-press/IA_museum.pdf
 http://latimesblogs.latimes.com/culturemonster/2011/03/irish-america-museum-obama-reagan-.html
 http://www.irishemigrant.com/ie/go.asp?p=story&storyID=8586
 http://www.irishgenealogynews.com/2012/01/north-american-connections.html
 http://www.meathchronicle.ie/news/meathsouth/articles/2011/03/23/4003904-skryne-man-in-bid-to-build-irishamerican-museum-in-washington/
 http://www.hiberniandigest.com/2010/06/08/building-the-irish-american-museum/
 http://irishamericanstoryproject.com/?m=201109
 http://www.indypressny.org/nycma/voices/469/briefs/briefs_3/
 http://www.irishamericannews.com/index.php?option=com_content&view=article&id=2314:dc-to-open-irish-american-museum&catid=82:usa&Itemid=199
 http://groups.irishabroad.com/group/irishamericanmusemwashingtondc/
 http://www.appalachianhistory.net/2011/07/cyrus-mccormick-did-not-invent-the-mechanical-reaper.html/cyrus-hall-mccormick
 http://www.prlog.org/11342454-national-irish-american-museum-seeks-funding-dc-location-h

Ethnic museums in Washington, D.C.
Irish-American culture in Washington, D.C.
Virtual museums
Proposed museums in the United States
Irish-American museums